Wanla is a village in the Leh district of Ladakh, India. It is located in the Khalsi tehsil, on the banks of the Yapola River (also known as the Wanla river). The Wanla Monastery is located in this village.

Demographics 
According to the 2011 census of India, Wanla has 170 households. The effective literacy rate (i.e. the literacy rate of population excluding children aged 6 and below) is 63.81%.

References

Villages in Khalsi tehsil